Adolf III may refer to:

 Adolf III of Berg, count of Berg from 1093 until 1132
 Adolf III of Holstein (1160–1225)
 Adolf III of the Marck (1334–1394)
 Adolf III of Nassau (c. 1423 – 1475)
 Adolf III of Nassau-Wiesbaden-Idstein (1443–1511)
 Adolf III of Schauenburg (1511–1556)